The Voice Kids is a British singing competition television series. Created by John de Mol, it premiered on ITV during the summer television cycle on 10 June 2017. Based on the original The Voice of Holland, and part of The Voice  franchise, it has aired five series and aims to feature young aspiring singers aged 7 to 14. The winners receive a monetary prize and a family holiday. Winners of the six series have been: Jess Folley, Daniel Davies, Sam Wilkinson, Justine Afante, Torrin Cuthill and Israella 
Chris. 

The series employs a panel of four coaches who critique the artists' performances and guide their teams of selected artists through the remainder of the series. They also compete to ensure that their act wins the competition, thus making them the winning coach. The original panel featured will.i.am, Danny Jones, and Pixie Lott; the panel for the most recent sixth series featured will.i.am, Jones, Lott and Ronan Keating. Other coaches from previous series include Jessie J, Paloma Faith, and Melanie C. In August 2022 it was announced that The Voice UK and The Voice Kids will return in 2023 on ITV.

The seventh series will commence in Summer 2023, following the same format as the previous seasons.

History
In early 2016, along with the announcement that The Voice UK would move to ITV under a three-year deal, it was announced that the network had ordered The Voice Kids, a junior spinoff featuring younger aspiring singers, for two series. After attaining high ratings, it was announced that the network had renewed The Voice Kids for three series. In 2021, the battles & the semi-final were axed.

Selection process
The open auditions application for the first series closed on 2 September 2016, with the age limit being 7–14 years old. The show began staging producers' audition days in August 2016 across the United Kingdom, with the blind auditions beginning filming in December 2016. For season 5, filming began in February 2021.

Format
There are four phases to the competition:
 Stage 1: Blind Auditions
 Stage 2: Battle Rounds
 Stage 3: Semi-Final
 Stage 4: Live Final (pre-recorded in 2020–present)

In the first series, the winner received £30,000 and a family trip to Disneyland Paris. Unlike the adult version, there are no knockouts rounds. When it was previously reported that the adult version's sixth series would feature five live shows (which turned out to be the usual three), reports claimed that there would be three live shows; however, there was only one, the live final. In 2021, the battles were axed. The semi-final was pre-recorded at LH2 Studios on 19 February 2017.

In the third series, the winner received £30,000 and the four finalists received a trip to Walt Disney World, Florida on Norwegian Airlines. In the fourth series, the winner received the same £30K prize, and a family trip to Universal Orlando Resort, Florida, also via Norwegian Airlines. For the sixth series, the winner gets the prize money and a family trip to Universal Orlando via TUI Airways.

Series overview 
Warning: the following table presents a significant number of different colors.

 Notes

Coaches and hosts
On 15 November 2016, it was announced Pixie Lott and Danny Jones from McFly would be coaches along with will.i.am. Of this announcement, Pixie Lott commented, "I can’t wait to join The Voice Kids and help discover the next big star. I have such a passion for talented young people and I know the UK will have lots – I can’t wait to hear them! I’m looking forward to getting started and working along the sides of my fellow coaches will.i.am and Danny Jones." Jones stated, "I'm pumped about joining The Voice Kids team. There are so many talented kids out there, they just need to be heard and this is a great platform for them. I’m looking forward to finding some fresh talent and coaching them. You never know, there might be a mini McFly out there!" and will.i.am said, "Doing The Voice Kids with Pixie and Danny is going to be dope and I'm really excited to discover just how talented British kids can be."

In December 2018, it was announced that Jessie J would join will.i.am, Jones, and Lott for the third series. Jessie J opted that she would not return to the show's 4th series. In November 2019, it was announced that Paloma Faith would replace Jessie J for the show's fourth season, alongside will.i.am, Lott and Jones. In August 2020, ITV confirmed that series 5 would air in 2021. On 7 February 2021 it was announced that Melanie C would replace Paloma Faith in series 5. In January 2022, it was announced that Ronan Keating would replace Melanie C in series 6.

Timeline of coaches

Coaches

Coaches' teams 
 Winner
 Finalist

 Winners are in bold, the finalists in the finale are in italicized font, and the eliminated artists are in small font.

Presenters
After the announcement that she would be staying with the adult show, Emma Willis announced in July 2016 that she would be presenting The Voice Kids, which boosted the show's popularity. Of this announcement, Willis commented, "Hosting The Voice Kids will be like being at my house on a Saturday night; lots of kids singing, with me trying to keep some kind of order. Thankfully, the musical genius that is will.i.am is there to bring some expertise to the table. It’s going to be pretty awesome."

Timeline of presenters

 Key
 Main presenter
 Backstage presenter

Ratings

References

2017 British television series debuts
2010s British reality television series
2020s British reality television series
2010s British music television series
2020s British music television series
British television spin-offs
ITV reality television shows
Reality television spin-offs
Television series about children
Television series about teenagers
Television series by ITV Studios
Television shows shot at Elstree Film Studios
The Voice UK